St Mary-at-the-Quay Church is a former Anglican church in Ipswich, Suffolk, England. The medieval building is under the care of the Churches Conservation Trust. and since September 2021 it has been used by River Church to implement an approach to evangelicism developed by Holy Trinity Brompton as part of the network of HTB church plants.
The church originally served the thriving industry around the docks area of the town and those that worked there. After closing for regular worship in the 1950s the church was transferred to the CCT in 1973  and underwent a major restoration programme completing in 2016.

Architecture and History
The medieval church on Key Street, Ipswich was formerly known as The Key Church, and the Church of Our Lady Star of the Sea (Stella Maris).

The church is constructed in flint with stone dressings.  Its plan includes a nave with a clerestory, north and south aisles, transepts, and a west tower.  The tower has diagonal buttresses decorated with flushwork, and an embattled parapet.  Its architectural style is Perpendicular.

Inside the church, the nave has a double hammerbeam roof, with carvings of the apostles, important figures in Ipswich history, and other designs.  In the church is a 15th-century octagonal font.  The font had been removed to a church at Brantham, but has been returned.  Also in the church are the tomb and brass of Henry Tooley, who built the almshouses nearby, and a copy of the Pownder brass.  Thomas Pounder (or Pownder), like Henry Tooley, was an Ipswich merchant.  The original of the brass is in Ipswich Museum.
The current St Mary's building was built between about 1450 and 1550, on the site of an earlier church dating back to the 1200s, in the dockland area of the town, the centre of the merchant community. It was one of twelve medieval churches in Ipswich, and one of three mariners' churches.  At this time it was probably known as Stella Maris (Our Lady, Star of the Sea).  During the 18th century the focus of economic activity moved away from the dockland area, and the size of the congregation declined.  Over the years, flooding of the church has caused structural problems and, in an attempt to prevent this, the vaults were filled with concrete during the 19th century.  In 1940–42 during the Second World War, the church was damaged by bombs, and most of the stained glass was lost.

Renovation and community use
After the war the church closed for worship.  In the 1990s repairs to it were organised by the Friends of Friendless Churches, and it was then used as the headquarters of Ipswich's Boys' Brigade.  When they left the church, it closed again, and was vested in the Churches Conservation Trust in 1973.  By this time most of the furnishings and contents had been removed.  The Trust has organised structural repairs to the church, in particular to deal with the flooding, as the salt water was causing decay of the columns of the arcades.  During the 2000s the church was a venue for conceptual art exhibitions and performances.  For a time it was home to an arts organisation known as Key Arts.  In 2010 plans were made for the church to be converted into a mental health wellbeing centre, run by Suffolk Mind, assisted by a grant from the Heritage Lottery Fund.

River Church 

River Church launched in 2021 and is led by Amy and Matt Key, who are both ordained in the Church of England. River Church aims to evangelise amongst students from the nearby University of Suffolk. River Church runs regular Alpha courses which had been developed by clergy at Holy Trinity Brompton .These aim to be more accessible by offering free food, short talks, and live music. They also serve refreshments during weekdays

See also
List of churches preserved by the Churches Conservation Trust in the East of England

References

Grade II* listed churches in Suffolk
Church of England church buildings in Ipswich
English Gothic architecture in Suffolk
Churches preserved by the Churches Conservation Trust
Former Church of England church buildings